The 2020 Campeonato Brasileiro Feminino A-1 was the 8th season of the Campeonato Brasileiro de Futebol Feminino Série A1, the top level of women's football in Brazil, and the 4th edition in a Série A1 since its establishment in 2016. The tournament was organized by the Brazilian Football Confederation (CBF).

The competition began on 8 February and was originally scheduled to end on 13 September, however due to the COVID-19 pandemic the tournament was suspended by CBF on 15 March. After several months, the tournament was resumed on 26 August and the end was rescheduled to 6 December.

In the finals, Corinthians won their second title after defeating Kindermann/Avaí 4–2 on aggregate. As champions and runners-up, Corinthians and Kindermann/Avaí qualified for the Copa Libertadores Femenina, while the bottom four teams in the group stage, Audax, Iranduba, Ponte Preta, and Vitória, were relegated to Campeonato Brasileiro de Futebol Feminino Série A2. Ferroviária were the defending champions, but they were eliminated in the quarter-finals.

Format
In the group stage, each team played once against the other fifteen teams. Top eight teams qualified for the final stages. Quarter-finals, semi-finals and finals were played on a home-and-away two-legged basis.

Teams

Sixteen teams competed in the league – the top twelve teams from the previous season, as well as four teams promoted from the 2019 Série A2.

Number of teams by state

Stadiums and locations

Group stage
In the group stage, each team played on a single round-robin tournament. The top eight teams advanced to the quarter-finals of the knockout stages. The teams were ranked according to points (3 points for a win, 1 point for a draw, and 0 points for a loss). If tied on points, the following criteria would be used to determine the ranking: 1. Wins; 2. Goal difference; 3. Goals scored; 4. Fewest red cards; 5. Fewest yellow cards; 6. Draw in the headquarters of the Brazilian Football Confederation (Regulations Article 12).

Group A

Results

Final stages
Starting from the quarter-finals, the teams played a single-elimination tournament with the following rules:
Quarter-finals, semi-finals and finals were played on a home-and-away two-legged basis, with the higher-seeded team hosting the second leg.
If tied on aggregate, the penalty shoot-out would be used to determine the winner (Regulations Article 13).
Extra time would not be played and away goals rule would not be used in final stages.

Starting from the semi-finals, the teams were seeded according to their performance in the tournament. The teams were ranked according to overall points. If tied on overall points, the following criteria would be used to determine the ranking: 1. Overall wins; 2. Overall goal difference; 3. Draw in the headquarters of the Brazilian Football Confederation (Regulations Article 17).

Bracket

Quarter-finals

|}

Group B

Corinthians won 5–1 on aggregate and advanced to the semi-finals.

Group C

São Paulo won 2–0 on aggregate and advanced to the semi-finals.

Group D

Kindermann/Avaí won 4–3 on aggregate and advanced to the semi-finals.

Group E

Tied 2–2 on aggregate, Palmeiras won on penalties and advanced to the semi-finals.

Semi-finals

|}

Group F

Corinthians won 3–0 on aggregate and advanced to the finals.

Group G

Kindermann/Avaí won 3–2 on aggregate and advanced to the finals.

Finals

|}

Group H

Top goalscorers

Awards

Individual awards
The following players were rewarded for their performances during the competition.

Best player: Gabi Zanotti (Corinthians)
Breakthrough player: Jaqueline Ribeiro (São Paulo)
Topscorer: Carla Nunes (Palmeiras)
Best goal of the tournament: Ingryd (Corinthians, playing against Palmeiras (Semi-finals second leg))
Best player (Internet-based poll): Kaká (Flamengo/Marinha)

Best XI
The best XI team was a squad consisting of the eleven most impressive players at the tournament.

||

References

Women's football leagues in Brazil
Association football events postponed due to the COVID-19 pandemic
2020 in Brazilian football